Kishalay Bhattacharjee (born  1969) is an Indian, senior journalist, columnist and author. 

He has written three books: Che in Paona Bazaar, Blood on my Hands and An Unfinished Revolution. 

He is currently working as a Professor and Dean of the Jindal School of Journalism and Communication, O.P. Jindal Global University. 

He is the executive of director Reachout Foundation, Former resident editor NDTV, Chair internal security and senior fellow IDSA, Trainer, and documentary filmmaker. He is also a curator for a festival called ArtEast.

Early life
Kishalay Bhattacharjee's mother Sobhona Bhattacharjee is a retired teacher and writer. Father Kamana Krishna Bhattacharjee, retired head of department, History, St. Edmund's College, Shillong and author of Making of North East India.

Education
Mr. Bhattacharjee completed his schooling from the St. Edmund's School, Shillong and completed a bachelor's course in English from St. Edmund's College, Shillong. He then went to North Eastern Hill University, Shillong for M.Phil coursework.

Career
Bhattacharjee worked for seventeen years at New Delhi Television (NDTV), as a Resident Editor. He reported on several conflicts during this time, including northeast India and Maoist corridor. He is currently a Professor and Associate Dean, Jindal School of Journalism and Communication at the OP Jindal Global University. He is also the founder- director of the Reachout Foundation, which works to defy stereotypes, fight prejudice and eliminate discrimination.

News reel

Kishalay Bhattacharjee is an Professor and Executive Dean in the Jindal School of Journalism and Communication at OP Jindal Global University, Sonipat, Haryana. His books include Che in Paona Bazaar: Tales of Exile and Belonging from India's Northeast (Pan Macmillan India, 2013), Blood on My Hands: Confessions of Staged Encounters(Harper Collins India, 2015) and most recently An Unfinished Revolution: A Hostage Crisis, Adivasi Resistance and the Naxal Movement (Pan Macmillan India, 2017). He was the recipient of the first and only Penguin Random House Writer's Residency Award in 2016. 

Besides covering conflict and post conflict stories, over the years Bhattacharjee has documented child soldiers in India, wildlife crime, narcotic trade, human trafficking and natural and man made disasters. His journalistic work on the Northeast of India is a resource that most media and academic organisations draw from.

Awards and recognition
Videocon Award for Television Excellence, 1994
Best Journalist Award, Assam and Meghalaya, 2004
Edward Murrow Fellow for Journalism, 2006
Presented papers at Heildelberg University, Germany 2013, S. Rajaratnam School of International Studies, Singapore 2011, Jamia Millia Islamia 2011 and 2013 and University of Southern California, 2006.
Ramnath Goenka Award for Excellence in Journalism, 2006 -2007
Panos Fellowship for HIV/AIDS, 2007
Nominated by Association of International Broadcasting AIB Awards, London for best current affairs programme in 2013
Penguin Random House Writers Residency Award
Moderated several roundtables in India and the US on media, strategic studies and writing
He was Chair of Internal Security and a Senior Fellow at the Institute for Defence Studies and Analyses (IDSA) in 2011.

Bibliography 

 Che in Paona Bazaar, Kishalaya Bhattacharjee, (Pan Macmillan; 2013), .
 Blood on My Hands: Confessions of Staged Encounters, Kishalaya Bhattacharjee, (HarperCollins Publishers India; 2015), .
 An Unfinished Revolution: A Hostage Crisis, Adivasi Resistance and the Naxal Movement, Kishalay Bhattacharjee, (Pan Macmillan; 2017), .

References

External links
Manohar Parrikar Institute for Defence Studies and Analyses: Kishalay Bhattacharjee Profile
NDTV: Reported By Kishalay Bhattacharjee
Scroll.in: Stories written by Kishalay Bhattacharjee

1969 births
Living people
Indian documentary filmmakers
Indian male television journalists
Bengali writers
Journalists from Assam
Writers from Guwahati